Gorgon City are an English electronic music production duo consisting of two North London producers Kye "Foamo" Gibbon and Matt "RackNRuin" Robson-Scott. Their 2013 debut single "Real" peaked at number 44 on the UK Singles Chart. They are also well known for their 2014 single "Ready for Your Love", which reached number 4 on the UK Singles Chart. They are currently signed to the UK-based record label Positiva Records which is a division of Universal Music Group.

Music career

2012–2013: Real EP

The duo's first collaboration The Crypt EP, featuring Navigator, Rubi Dan, and Janai, was released on 27 February 2012. One year later, on 17 February 2013, they collaborated with Yasmin for the lead track of the Real EP. The song peaked at number 44 on the UK Singles Chart and number 7 on the UK Indie Chart.

2013–2014: Sirens

On 12 May 2013, they released "Intentions", featuring Clean Bandit. On 26 January 2014, they released "Ready for Your Love" featuring MNEK. The song is their highest-charting song to date, entering the UK Singles Chart at number four. On 23 March 2014, they released "There Is No Other Time", a collaborative single with indie rock group Klaxons. On 26 May 2014, they released "Here for You", the third single from their debut studio album. The song entered the UK Singles Chart at number seven. They produced Jess Glynne's single "Right Here", which was released on 6 July 2014. They remixed the song "Back 2 the Wild" by Basement Jaxx in August 2014 for the album Junto. The fourth single from their debut studio album, "Unmissable", premiered on MistaJam's 1Xtra show on 21 July 2014. The song entered the UK Singles Chart at number nineteen. The album, Sirens was released on 6 October 2014 and peaked at number 10 on the UK Albums Chart. A compilation album alongside Pete Tong, entitled All Gone Pete Tong and Gorgon City Miami 2015, was released on 22 March 2015. The compilation features two exclusive tracks from Gorgon City: "Sky High" and "The Terminal".

2015–present: Escape
Escape is Gorgon City's second studio album, released on 10 August 2018. Revealed collaborations on the album were to be Vaults, Duke Dumont, Naations, Kamille, Ghosted, and D Double E.

At the beginning of 2015, shortly after releasing the last single from their debut studio album Sirens, "Go All Night" featuring vocals from Jennifer Hudson, they released a new single, which was called "Saving My Life", featuring vocals from musician ROMANS. This sparked much interest about the pair making more material for a second studio album.

A year later, in April 2016, they released the official audio of the lead single "All Four Walls", featuring vocals from British band Vaults. After releasing the single, the pair confirmed that their second studio album is to be titled Escape. Afterwards, "Impaired Vision", featuring vocals from Tink and Mikky Ekko was released. In between releasing the singles, promotional singles were also released: "Blue Parrot", "Doubts", and "Smoke". "Zoom Zoom" was released, featuring vocals from Wyclef Jean.

Discography

Studio albums

Extended plays

Singles

Promotional singles

Production credits

Remixes

References

Notes
 A  "Intentions" did not chart on the Ultratop's Belgian Flanders Single's Chart, but it did chart at number 88 on the Ultratip chart, the top-100 songs which haven't made the Ultratop 50.
 B  "Ready for Your Love" did not chart on the Ultratop's Belgian Flanders Single's Chart, but it did chart at number 2 on the Ultratip chart, the top-100 songs which haven't made the Ultratop 50.
 C  "Here for You" did not chart on the Ultratop's Belgian Flanders Single's Chart, but it did chart at number 69 on the Ultratip chart, the top-100 songs which haven't made the Ultratop 50.

Sources

External links
 

21st-century English musicians
Black Butter Records artists
English house music duos
Electronic dance music duos
Male musical duos
UK garage duos
Musical groups from London
DJs from London
DJ duos
Priority Records artists
Virgin Records artists
21st-century British male musicians
Remixers